Bargh may refer to:

People
 Ian Bargh (1935–2012), British jazz pianist
 John Bargh (born 1955), American social psychologist
 Renee Bargh (born 1986), Australian entertainment reporter
 Robyn Bargh, New Zealand book publishing executive

Sports
 Bargh Shiraz F.C., an Iranian football club based in Shiraz, Iran
 Bargh Tehran F.C., an Iranian football club based in Tehran, Iran, dissolved in 2007
 Bargh Shiraz FSC, an Iranian futsal club based in Shiraz

Other uses
 Bargh., author abbreviation for American paleobotanist Elso Sterrenberg Barghoorn
 Bargh Glacier, in Antarctica